Mary Buckland (née Morland; 20 November 1797 – 30 November 1857) was an English palaeontologist, marine biologist and scientific illustrator.

Early life and family

Mary Morland was born in 1797 in Sheepstead House, Abingdon-on-Thames, to Benjamin Morland, a solicitor, Her mother, Harriet Baster Morland, died when she was a baby, and her father remarried, producing a large family of half-brothers and sisters. She was educated in Southampton, and spent a part of her childhood under the care of Sir Christopher Pegge, a Regius Professor of Anatomy in Oxford, who along with his wife supported her scientific interests.

In the midst of her teenage years she was intrigued by the studies conducted by Georges Cuvier and provided him with specimens and illustrations. Buckland established a name for herself as a scientific draughtswoman, who helped Conybeare, Cuvier, and her soon to be husband, William Buckland.

Marriage

According to Caroline Fox, Buckland met her husband William Buckland in the following way: 

In 1825 Mary married Buckland, who later became Dean of Westminster. Their honeymoon was a geological tour lasting a year, including visits to geologists and geological locations across Europe. They had nine children, including Frank Buckland and author Elizabeth Oke Buckland Gordon. The children were exposed to their parents' collections of fossils from an early age and at the age of 4, Frank could successfully identify the vertebrae of an ichthyosaurus. Buckland supported her husband's pursuits, while balancing her time to help educate, and teach her children. She also spent her time promoting education within the villages. During her marriage, her desire to pursue science was limited because of her husband's disproval of women being engaged in scientific pursuits. 

Her eldest son Frank, said the following about his mother for her contribution to Buckland's work:

Later life

In 1842 Mary's husband fell ill and his mental health began to decline. In 1850 he was sent to John Bush's Mental Asylum at Clapham in London. Shortly after, Mary retired to St Leonards-on-Sea in Sussex and continued to show an appreciation of her husband's studies. Mary died in St Leonards on 30 November 1857, and was buried in Islip, Oxfordshire Mary Buckland amassed a vast collection of fossils and other specimens and taught in a village school in Islip, near the family's country home.

Career

Mary Buckland started her career as a teenager producing illustrations and providing specimens for George Cuvier, widely regarded as the founder of paleontology, as well as for the British geologist William Conybeare. She made models of fossils, and labelled fossils for the Oxford University Museum of Natural History, studied marine zoophytes and repaired broken fossils inline with her husband's instructions.

Mary Buckland assisted her husband greatly by writing as he dictated, editing, producing elaborate illustrations for his books, taking notes of his observations, and writing much of it herself. Her skills as an artist are on display in Mr. Buckland's largely illustrated work Reliquiae diluvianae, published in 1823, and in his Geology and Mineralogy in 1836. Her son noted that she was particularly "neat and clever in mending fossils" with specially developed cementing, and in assisting William Buckland's experiments to reproduce fossil tracks and many others. She assisted him when he was commissioned to contribute a volume to The Bridgewater Treatises. 

Although Mary Buckland was in poor health after her husband's death, she continued her husband's work and branched out her own research. Examining micro forms of marine life through a microscope, with her daughter Caroline, and arranging a large collection of zoophytes and sponges, which she collected during her visits to the Channel islands of Guernsey and Sark with her husband. Much of her fossil reconstructions are held by the Oxford University Museum of Natural History.

References

Further reading

1797 births
1857 deaths
19th-century English people
English palaeontologists
Scientific illustrators
People from Abingdon-on-Thames
Women paleontologists
19th-century British geologists
Women geologists